The 2014 Australian Manufacturers' Championship was an Australian motor racing series for modified production touring cars. It comprised three CAMS sanctioned national championship titles:
 The 2014 Australian Manufacturers' Championship for automobile manufacturers
 The 2014 Australian Production Car Championship for drivers
 The 2014 Australian Endurance Championship for drivers

The 2014 Australian Manufacturers' Championship was the 29th manufacturers title to be awarded by CAMS and the 20th to be contested under the Australian Manufacturers' Championship name. The 2014 Australian Production Car Championship was the 21st Australian Production Car Championship and the 2014 Australian Endurance Championship was the 12th Australian Endurance Championship.

Australian Manufacturers Championship Pty Ltd was appointed by CAMS as the Category Manager for the championship.

The Manufacturers title was won by BMW, the Production Car title by Beric Lynton (BMW 1M), and the Endurance title by Grant Sherrin (BMW 135i).

Class structure

Cars competed in the following six classes:
 Class A : Extreme Performance
 Class B : High Performance
 Class C : Performance Touring
 Class D : Production Touring
 Class E : Compact Touring
 Class I : Invitational

A seventh class – Class F – for hybrid or alternative energy vehicles, had no competitors.

Calendar
The championship was contested over a five round series.

The results for each Round of the Championship were determined by the number of points scored by each driver at that round.

Points system
Each manufacturer was able to score points towards the Australian Manufacturers' Championship title from the two highest placed automobiles of its make, in any class, excluding Class I. The title was awarded to the manufacturer scoring the highest total number of class points over all rounds of the championship.
 In rounds with one scheduled race, points were awarded to manufacturers on a 120–90–72–60–54–48–42–36–30–24–18–12–6 basis for the first thirteen places in each class with 3 points for other finishers.
 In rounds with two scheduled races, points were awarded to manufacturers on a 60–45–36–30–27–24–21–18–15–12–9–6–3 basis for the first thirteen places in each class in each race with 2 points for other finishers.

Points towards the Australian Production Car Championship outright title were awarded to drivers based on outright finishing positions attained in each race. Points were awarded using the same two scales as used for the Australian Manufacturers' Championship with the addition of two points for the driver setting the fastest qualifying lap in each class at each round.

Points towards the Australian Production Car Championship class titles were awarded to drivers based on class finishing positions attained in each race. Points were awarded using the same two scales as used for the Australian Manufacturers' Championship with the addition of two points for the driver setting the fastest qualifying lap in each class at each round.

Points towards the Australian Endurance Championship outright title were awarded to drivers based on outright finishing positions attained in each of the first three single-race rounds. Points were awarded using the same scale as used for the Australian Manufacturers' Championship with the addition of two points for the driver setting the fastest qualifying lap in each class at each round.

Points towards the Australian Endurance Championship class titles were awarded to drivers based on class finishing positions attained in each of the first three single-race rounds. Points were awarded using the same scale as used for the Australian Manufacturers' Championship with the addition of two points for the driver setting the fastest qualifying lap in each class at each round.

Results

Australian Manufacturers' Championship

Australian Production Car Championship

Outright

Class

Australian Endurance Championship
The Australian Endurance Championship was awarded to the driver who scored the highest total number of outright points over Rounds 1, 2 & 3 of the Championship.

A Class award for the Australian Endurance Championship was presented to each driver who scored the highest total number of points for each Class, excluding Class I over the first three rounds of the Championship.

References

Australian Manufacturers' Championship
Australian Production Car Championship
Australian Endurance Championship
Manufacturers' Championship